Ungiiviit formerly the Wilmot Islands are an island group located in Coronation Gulf, south of Victoria Island, in the Kitikmeot Region, Nunavut, Canada. Other island groups in the vicinity include the Nakahungaqtuaryuit, Chapman Islands, Cockburn Islands, Nattiqtuut, Jameson Islands, Piercey Islands, Porden Islands, and Triple Islands.

References 

Islands of Coronation Gulf
Uninhabited islands of Kitikmeot Region